Burmagomphus pyramidalis, sinuate clubtail, is a species of dragonfly in the family Gomphidae. It is found in India and Sri Lanka. There are 2 subspecies, where they are geographically separated.

Subspecies
 Burmagomphus pyramidalis pyramidalis - In India
 Burmagomphus pyramidalis sinuatus - In Sri Lanka

Description and habitat
It is a medium sized dragonfly with black thorax, marked with greenish-yellow. There is a sinuous dorsal stripe which is formed by the union of an ante-humeral with a humeral stripe. Sides of the thorax are yellow, marked with a narrow, black stripe on the postero-lateral suture and on the lower half of the anterior suture. Wings are transparent, slightly tinted with saffron at bases. Abdomen is black, marked with yellow. Segment 1 has  a triangular mark on dorsum at apex and a broad baso-lateral spot. Segment 2 has a dorsal stripe and a very broad spot on sides. Segment 3 to 8 have narrow basal rings. Segment 9 has its apical half yellow. Segment 10 is entirely black. Anal appendages are black. Female is similar to the male.

It is found on the river sides and on the rocks in the streams.

See also
 List of odonates of India
 List of odonata of Kerala

References

Sources
 pyramidalis.html World Dragonflies
 Animal diversity web
 India Biodiversity
 List of odonates of Sri Lanka

See also 
 List of odonates of India
 List of odonates of Sri Lanka
 List of odonata of Kerala

Gomphidae
Insects described in 1922